The Dell Dimension series was a line of home and business desktop computers manufactured by Dell. In 2007, the Dimension series was discontinued and replaced with the Dell Inspiron series for low-end models and the Dell Studio series for higher-end models.

The last high-end computers to be released under the Dimension line were the 9200 and 9200c (XPS 410 and XPS 210 in the American market, respectively). The E520, E521 and C521 were re-introduced under the Inspiron line under the names Inspiron 530, 531, 530s and 531s, with a revised case design.

Models

Dimension 4xx Series - 433SV, 466V
Dimension 9xx Series - 900
Dimension 1xxx Series - 1000, 1100
Dimension 2xxx Series - 2010, 2100, 2200, 2300, 2300C, 2350, 2400, 2400C
Dimension 3xxx Series - 3000, 3100, 3100c, 3400, 3800
Dimension 4xxx Series - 4100, 4200, 4300, 4300S, 4400, 4500, 4500C, 4500S, 4550, 4600, 4600C, 4700, 4700C, 4700 MCE, 4800
Dimension 5xxx Series - 5000, 5100, 5150, 5150C, 5200, 5200C
Dimension 8xxx Series - 8100, 8200, 8250, 8300, 8300N, 8400, 8400 MCE
Dimension 9xxx Series - 9100, 9150, 9200, 9200C
Dimension B Series - B110
Dimension C Series - C521
Dimension D Series - DE051
Dimension E Series - E310, E510, E520, E521, E530
Dimension J Series 
Dimension L Series (Lxxx is MHz; R is PIII; C, CX, CXE are Celeron)
L___c - L400c, L433c, L466c, L500c
L___cx - L433cx, L500cx, L533cx, L566cx, L600cx, L633cx, L667cx, L700cx, L733cx, L800cx
L___cxe - L700cxe, L800cxe
L___r - L500r, L550r, L600r, L667r, L733r, L800r, L866r, L933r, L1000r, L1100r
Dimension M Series - M166a, M200a, M233a
Dimension P Series - P100a, P133a, P166a, P75t, P90t, P100t, P120t, P133t, P133v, P166v, P200v
Dimension V Series - V333, V350, V400, V450, V333c, V400c, V433c, V466c
Dimension XPS Series
XPS 4 - 466V
XPS B - B866, B933, B1000, B533r, B600r, B667r, B733r, B800r, B866r, B933r, B1000r
XPS D - D233, D266, D300, D333
XPS H - H233, H266
XPS M - M166s, M200s, M233s
XPS P - P60, P75, P90, P100, P90c, P100c, P120c, P133c, P150c, P166c, P133s, P166s, P200s
XPS Pro - Pro150, Pro200, Pro150n, Pro180n, Pro200n
XPS R - R350, R400, R450
XPS T - T450, T500, T550, T600, T600r, T650r, T700r, T750r, T800r, T850r

Technical details

4xx series

9xx series

1xxx series

2xxx series

3xxx and 5xxx series

 * As of BIOS Revision 1.1.11 # As of BIOS Revision 2.4

4xxx series

8xxx series
 The Dimension 8200 shipped with two different motherboards depending on the release date. The earlier version used the i850 chipset with a Socket 478 (400 MHz FSB), while the later version used the i850E chipset with a Socket 478 (400 MHz and 533 MHz FSB).

9xxx series
 The Dimension 9150 was known as the XPS 400 in United States markets, along with the Dimension 9200 being rebadged to XPS 410 in U.S. markets.

L series

M series

P series

V series 

 *Dell lists this speed in the technical specifications, however the "V466c" model does not seem to have been released, and Intel never released a 466 MHz Slot 1 Celeron

XPS series

References

External links

Dell
Dimension
Discontinued products